The following are the national records in speed skating in the Czech Republic maintained by the Czech Speed Skating Federation.

Men

Women

References

External links
 Czech Speed Skating Federation  web site

National records in speed skating
Speed skating-related lists
Speed skating
Records
Speed skating